Loutros may refer to the following places:

Loutros, Cyprus, a village in northern Cyprus
Loutros, Evros, a village in the Evros regional unit, Greece
Loutros, Imathia, a village in the municipality Alexandreia, Imathia, Greece

See also

Loutro (disambiguation)